The Battle of Qinnasrin was a battle between the Zengids and the County of Tripoli following a successful campaign against Antioch led by Imad al-Din Zengi.

In 1135 Imad al-Din Zengi led a campaign against Antioch during which he captured Atharib, Zardana, Tell Aghdi, Ma’arat al-Nu’man, Ma’arrat Misrin and Kafartab.

The Count of Tripoli, Bertrand, in an attempt to make up for the loss of Ma’arat al-Nu’man and block the road that crossed Syria from north to south, launched an attack on Qinnasrin, however Zengi repelled the attack and the Franks retreated.

References

Battles involving the Zengid dynasty
Battles involving the Seljuk Empire